Operation Romeo was a French World War II commando operation to disable German artillery atop the cliffs of Cap Nègre. The operation happened the evening before Operation Dragoon, the main invasion of Southern France. The force consisted of 800 French commandos of the 1er Commando Français de l'Afrique du Nord (First French Commando of North Africa), commanded by Lieutenant Colonel Georges-Régis Bouvet. The attacking flotilla included the command ship HMCS Prince David, HMCS Prince Henry, HMS Princess Beatrix, HMS Prins Albert and four U.S. Motor Torpedo Boats.

At 0130 15 August, 95 commandos in landing craft from Prince David beached first, while the remainder of the force waited offshore. Half an hour later, they sent word back that the enemy gun positions had been silenced. The main body of Romeo then came onto the beach. About 800 commandos moved quickly and were soon established across the main road between Toulon and the Riviera. 300 German soldiers were killed and 700 taken prisoner. The French commandos suffered 11 men killed and 50 wounded. The force held its position until relieved by VI Corps from the east on August 15, 1944.

Notes

References

Romeo
Romeo